Hockley railway station is on the Shenfield to Southend Line in the East of England, serving the village of Hockley, Essex. The Engineer's Line Reference for the line is SSV; the station's three-letter station code is HOC. The two platforms have an operational length for 12-coach trains.

History 
The line from Wickford to Southend and Hockley station were opened on 1 October 1889. There was a signal box on the down platform, this was decommissioned in 1938 with the introduction of colour light signalling on the line between Wickford and Southend. There was a goods yard on the 'up' side to the west of the station, a 30 cwt crane was subsequently installed. Freight traffic ceased on 5 June 1967. Electrification of the Shenfield to Southend Victoria line using 1.5 kV DC overhead line electrification (OLE) was completed on 31 December 1956. This was changed to 6.25 kV AC in November 1960 and to 25 kV AC in January 1979.

Services 
The station is currently managed by Greater Anglia, which also operates all trains serving it.

References

External links

Railway stations in Essex
DfT Category C2 stations
Transport in Rochford District
Former Great Eastern Railway stations
Greater Anglia franchise railway stations
William Neville Ashbee railway stations
Railway stations in Great Britain opened in 1889